Coolspring is an unincorporated community in Jefferson County, Pennsylvania, United States.

Coolspring was served by a post office from 1838 until 1966.

References

Unincorporated communities in Jefferson County, Pennsylvania
Unincorporated communities in Pennsylvania